The Capital Transit System is the public transportation agency that serves the City and Borough of Juneau, Alaska. Owned by the municipality, it operates sixteen bus routes, three of which run 6am to 11pm (6pm Sundays), seven days a week, with the remaining thirteen running as limited weekday express services. Although CTS, like most US bus systems, operates fixed routes with fixed stations, some stops are flag stop only and some routes offer complete flag stop service along the route.

Route list

 1 Douglas: The fourth main population center of the borough is served by this route. It begins by making a narrow loop through Juneau's government corridor and downtown, before passing west over the Juneau-Douglas Bridge and heading south along the Douglas Highway, ending where 3rd St. turns into St. Anns before looping around at Savikkio Park/Sandy Beach. This route operates seven days a week.
 3 Mendenhall Loop Counterclockwise: This route along with route 4 are the core routes in the system, it serves three of the four primary populated places in the borough: Mendenhall Valley, Lemon Creek, and the city center of Juneau. In the west, the route makes a large counterclockwise loop through the Mendenhall Valley, serving the Mendenhall Mall, before travelling east along the older and more business lined Glacier Highway (as opposed to Eagan Drive, the bypass). While passing through the Lemon Creek area, it passes Gastuneau Humane Society, Juneau Police Department, Bartlett Regional Hospital, and various homes and business. It ends in the east with a narrow loop through central Juneau, passing various government buildings.  This route operates seven days a week.
 4 Mendenhall Loop Clockwise: Follows the same route as route 3, but instead does a clockwise loop around Mendenhall. This route operates seven days a week.
 5 University Express: Hourly weekday express between downtown, the airport, and the university. 
 6 Riverside Express:  Hourly weekday express between downtown, the airport, and Riverside/Mendenhall Mall.
 7 Lemon Creek Express: Once a weekday morning express from Lemon Creek to downtown.
 8 Valley Express: Reverse weekday afternoon express from downtown to Auke Bay. 
 9 Mendenhall Valley Express: Once a weekday morning express from Auke Bay to downtown.
 10 Mendenhall Valley Commuter: Additional once a weekday morning express from Auke Bay to downtown, via Taku Blvd.
 11 Douglas to Valley Express: Once a weekday morning express from Douglas to Auka Bay, via downtown.
 12 North Douglas: Weekday service between North Douglas and downtown, with one bus into downtown in the AM and one returning in the PM. (flag stop service anywhere along route)
 14 Mendenhall / Riverside Commuter: Once a weekday morning express from Glacier Hwy & Industrial Blvd to downtown.
 15 Valley / UAS Express: Reverse weekday morning express from downtown to the University (one per day).
 16 Taku Express: Additional once a weekday morning express from Glacier Hwy & Industrial Blvd to downtown. via Mendenhall Loop Road.

(Downtown in this list refers to any stop in downtown Juneau, including the Downtown Transit Center, the Federal Building, 4th Street & Seward Street, and Franklin & Front St.)

References

Bus transportation in Alaska
Transportation in Juneau, Alaska
Transit agencies in Alaska